Open Europe may refer to:

 GT Cup Open Europe (motorsports), a GT4 grand touring sports car championship series
 Alliance for an Open Europe (politics), a Eurosceptic and free market transnational political organisation
 Open Europe (politics), a defunct British centre-right eurosceptic policy think tank
 Policy Exchange (politics), the organization into which Open Europe merged into

See also

 OpenForum Europe (software)
 
 European Open (disambiguation)

Disambiguation pages